The Gasser M1870 was a revolver chambered for 11.3×36mmR and was adopted by the Austro-Hungarian Cavalry in 1870. It was an open-frame model, with the barrel unit attached to the frame by a screw beneath the cylinder arbor. The arbor pin was screwed into the barrel unit and fitted into a recess in the standing breech. The cylinder was gate-loaded from the right side, and a rod ejector was carried beneath the barrel. A unique safety bar will usually be found on the right of the frame, below the cylinder. This carries pins which pass through holes in the frame to engage the lock mechanism. Slightly retracting the hammer allows one of these pins to move inward, preventing the hammer moving forward again when released. The pistol can thereafter be carried safely when loaded. Pressure on the trigger withdraws the pin from the path of the hammer before firing. The M1870 Gasser became the Austro-Hungarian cavalry revolver. It chambered a long 11.25mm centerfire cartridge which had earlier been used in Fruwirth carbines.

Gasser-Kropatschek M1876 
The Gasser-Kropatschek M1876 was adopted by Austria Hungary in 1876 as a refinement of the 1870 Gasser design. Instigated by Alfred Kropatschek, the changes being principally a matter of reducing weight by reducing the caliber to 9mm.

Montenegrin "Gasser Pattern" revolvers

Specification 
The title 'Montenegrin Gasser' covers a variety of six-chamber large calibre revolvers. The standard issue in the Montenegrin military was the Austrian Gasser Model 1870 in 11.2mm which became known as the Montenegrin Gasser. Montenegrin revolvers originally appeared as open-frame models, similar to the Austrian Gasser M1870 and usually in 11mm nominal (11.3mm actual) calibers. Single and double-action locks were used, grips were often in ivory or bone, engraving and gold inlay work was common, and the predominant impression was one of weight and bulk. Later Montenegrin revolvers offered hinged-frame construction, with Galand cylinder locks and a self-extracting mechanism. Most are marked 'Guss Stahl' (crucible cast steel frame), 'Kaiser's Patent' and similar phrases.

Mandatory ownership 
In 1910 King Nicholas I of Montenegro proclaimed that all male citizens were members of a national militia and had both a right and a duty to own at least one Gasser Pattern revolver under penalty of law. 

The official reason for the King's decree was to create an armed populace that would deter neighbouring countries from attacking Montenegro, which was unable to field a large army. However, it was widely believed in Montenegro that this decision was actually taken because the King owned shares in Leopold Gasser Waffenfabrik in Vienna - the patent holder and sole manufacturer of the pistol at that time. Despite this, the decree actually obliged Montenegrin adult males to own a Gasser Pattern revolver, not necessarily one made by Gasser itself. In fact Leopold Gasser was faced with such heavy demand for the pistol internationally, that it could not fulfil all of the orders placed for it. This led the revolver's manufacturer to license out production to other companies and many Gasser Pattern pistols were then manufactured and sold by other European firms, most notably based out of Belgium and Spain. Even these licensed models did not satiate demand for the pistol and this, alongside a lax enforcement of intellectual property rights in Montenegro, led to many unlicensed local models of the pistol also being produced, with quality ranging from very good to outright dangerous to its user. 

Subsequently, the weapon quickly became a status symbol for Montenegrin men and was commonly worn alongside traditional attire. Many Montenegrin immigrants that travelled to North America brought their Gasser pattern revolvers with them and at least two batches of several thousand pistols were smuggled into Mexico during the Mexican Revolution, leading to the Gasser revolver becoming widespread in the Americas. However, as the original reason for their mass production and the generation that grew around it faded, the pistol eventually lost its place as a status symbol and many were either given away or sold in the secondhand market.

Later Gasser models 
Genuine Austrian Gasser products are marked 'L. GASSER PATENT WIEN' or 'L. GASSER OTTAKRING PATENT', and often carry the Gasser trademark of a heart pierced by an arrow. Gasser also produced revolvers for the commercial market. The Gasser-Kropatschek, for example, appeared with fluted cylinders instead of the smooth-surfaced military pattern. He also produced the 9mm 'Post & Police' solid frame non-ejecting double-action revolver, with a hexagonal barrel. A commercial version of this gun was also made, generally offering better finish. There was also a commercial version of the open-frame M1874 in 9mm, and a 9mm hinged frame self-extracting model with the Galand double-action lock.

References

Early revolvers
World War I Austro-Hungarian infantry weapons
Military revolvers
Single-action revolvers
Police weapons